Holophaea lugens is a moth of the subfamily Arctiinae. It was described by E. Dukinfield Jones in 1908. It is found in Brazil.

References

 

Euchromiina
Moths described in 1908